Elizabeth Abbott (born 1942) is a Canadian writer, historian and animal rights activist. She is the former dean of women for St. Hilda's College at the University of Toronto and is currently a senior research associate at Trinity College, University of Toronto.

Abbott has written numerous books, and has contributed to many publications, including The Globe and Mail, Toronto Star, Ottawa Citizen, The Gazette (Montreal), Quill & Quire, Huffington Post and London Free Press.

Abbott ran to represent the riding of Toronto—Danforth in the House of Commons of Canada at the 2015 and 2019 Canadian federal elections as a member of the Animal Protection Party of Canada.

Bibliography 
 Tropical Obsession: A Universal Tragedy in Four Acts Set in Haiti, 1986
 Haiti: The Duvaliers and their Legacy, 1988
 A History of Celibacy, 1999
 A History of Mistresses, 2003
 Sugar: A Bittersweet History, 2008
 A History of Marriage, 2010
 Haiti: A Shattered Nation, 2011

A History of Mistresses 
Elizabeth Abbott's 2003 book examines the large, and often underground history of mistresses. Ranging from Roman Europe to Twentieth Century America, Abbott explores the lives of the 'scarlet women' and the implications of their extramarital relationships.

A History of Marriage 
Elizabeth Abbot's third book in her trilogy on the history of relationships examines various rituals of courting, nuptials, marriage, sex, child-raising and divorce.  The book was a finalist for the 2010 Governor General's Literary Award in the category of English non-fiction.

Seven Stories Press reprinted A History of Marriage in paperback in August 2015.

Haiti: A Shattered Nation 
This is an update of her 1988 book, Haiti: The Duvaliers and their Legacy, commissioned after the 2010 Haiti earthquake, for which she added a new introduction and two new chapters.

References

External links 
 Official website
 Penguin Publisher profile

1942 births
Living people
Canadian animal rights activists
Canadian non-fiction writers
Canadian women non-fiction writers
Concordia University alumni
Historians of Haiti
McGill University alumni
Ontario candidates for Member of Parliament